Venera 6 ( meaning Venus 6), or 2V (V-69) No.331, was a Soviet spacecraft, launched towards Venus to obtain atmospheric data.

The spacecraft was very similar to Venera 4 although it was of a stronger design. This capsule contained scientific instruments.

During descent towards the surface of Venus, a parachute opened to slow the rate of descent. For 51 minutes on May 17, 1969, while the capsule was suspended from the parachute, data from the Venusian atmosphere were returned.

The spacecraft also carried a medallion bearing the State Coat of Arms of the Soviet Union and a bas-relief of Lenin to the night side of Venus.

Given the results from Venera 4, the Venera 5 and Venera 6 landers contained new chemical analysis experiments tuned to provide more precise measurements of the atmosphere's components. Knowing the atmosphere was extremely dense, the parachutes were also made smaller so the capsule would reach its full crush depth before running out of power (as Venera-4 had done).

Instruments

Spaceship 
 Instrument COP-18-3M for the study of cosmic particle streams;
 LA-2U device for determining the distribution of oxygen and hydrogen in the planet's atmosphere.

Lander 
 Pressure sensors MDDA-A type to measure atmospheric pressure in the range from 100 to 30,000 mm Hg Art. (0,13–40 atm);
 G-8 gas analyzers to determine the chemical composition of the atmosphere;
 VIP device for determining the density of the atmosphere at an altitude;
 FD-69 for illumination measurements in the atmosphere;
 EC-164D to determine the temperature at the height of the atmosphere.

Mission 
Venera 6 was launched into an Earth parking orbit on January 10, 1969, at 05:51:52 UT and then from a Tyazheliy Sputnik (69-002C) towards Venus. After a mid-course maneuver on March 16 the Venera 6 probe was released on May 17, 1969,  from the planet. 

It entered the nightside atmosphere at 06:05 UT and deployed the parachute. The probe sent back readouts every 45 seconds for 51 minutes and ceased operation due to the temperature and pressure effects at roughly  altitude. The photometer failed to operate, but the atmosphere was sampled at 2 bar and 10 bar pressures.

See also
 List of missions to Venus

External links

 Venera 6 at Lavochkin website

References

Venera program
Spacecraft launched in 1969
1969 in the Soviet Union
Derelict landers (spacecraft)
2MV